The 1963 Cork Senior Hurling Championship was the 75th staging of the Cork Senior Hurling Championship since its establishment by the Cork County Board in 1887. The draw for the opening round fixtures took place at the Cork Convention on 27 January 1963. The championship began on 7 April 1963 and ended on 29 September 1963.

Glen Rovers were the defending champions, however, they were defeated by University College Cork in the first round.

On 29 September 1963, University College Cork won the championship following a 4-17 to 5-6 defeat of Blackrock in the final. This was their first championship title.

Mossie Finn from the St. Finbarr's club was the championship's top scorer with 4-15.

Team changes

To Championship

Promoted from the Cork Intermediate Hurling Championship
 Midleton

Fielded a team after a one-year absence
 Duhallow

Results

First round

Quarter-finals

Semi-finals

Final

Championship statistics

Top scorers

Top scorer overall

Top scorers in a single game

Championship statistics

Miscellaneous

 University College Cork become the first college to win the title.
 The Seán Óg Murphy Cup is presented for the first time.

References

Cork Senior Hurling Championship
Cork Senior Hurling Championship